The Treaty of Zamora (5 October 1143) recognized Portugal as a kingdom with its own monarch by the Kingdom of León. Based on the terms of the accord, King Alfonso VII of León recognized the Kingdom of Portugal in the presence of his cousin King Afonso I of Portugal, witnessed by the papal representative, Cardinal Guido de Vico, at the Cathedral of Zamora. Both kings promised durable peace between their kingdoms. By this treaty Afonso I of Portugal also recognized the suzerainty of the Pope.

This treaty came as of a result of the Battle of Valdevez.

Background 
Victorious in the Battle of Ourique, in 1139, Afonso Henriques benefited from the developed action by the archbishop of Braga, D. João Peculiar, in favor of the constitution of the new Kingdom of Portugal. To reconcile Afonso Henriques and his cousin Alfonso VII of León, the archbishop made arrangements for them to meet in Zamora in 4 and 5 of October 1143 in the presence of the cardinal Guido de Vico.

Result 

By the terms of the treaty, Alfonso VII agreed that the County of Portugal would become a kingdom, and that D. Afonso Henriques would be its king. The Portuguese sovereignty, recognized by Alfonso VII in Zamora, was only confirmed by Pope Alexander III in 1179, but the title of rex, which D. Afonso Henriques used since 1140, was confirmed at Zamora, when the Portuguese monarch committed, before the cardinal, to consider himself a vassal of the Holy See, being then obliged, himself and his descendants, to pay an annual tithe to the Pope.

From 1143, D. Afonso Henriques would send repentance letters to the Pope declaring himself his lord vassal and committing himself to sending a determined amount of gold every year. The negotiations would last several years, from 1143 to 1179. In 1179, Pope Alexander III would send D. Afonso Henriques the papal bull "Manifestis probatum", in which the Pope accepted that D. Afonso Henriques would pay him direct vassalage, acknowledging definitely the independence of the Kingdom of Portugal without vassalage to Alfonso VII (because a vassal couldn't have two direct lords) and D. Afonso Henriques as first king of Portugal, Afonso I of Portugal.

See also
History of Portugal
List of treaties
Timeline of Portuguese history

References

1143 in Europe
12th century in Portugal
12th-century treaties
Treaties of the Kingdom of León
Zamora
12th century in the Kingdom of León